EuroManx was a Manx airline based at Ronaldsway Airport, which operated scheduled domestic passenger services as well as business charters. On 9 May 2008 the airline announced that it was ceasing all operations, citing rising fuel prices and reduced passenger numbers as the reasons.

History

The airline was established on 7 August 2002 and started operations on 19 August 2002. It is no relation to Manx Airlines which operated for many years prior to purchase by British Airways. It was established by Allan Keen, managing director of Isle of Man-based Woodgate Aviation. Corporate Jet Services and UK investors acquired EuroManx fully in September 2004. EuroManx initially operated with leased equipment including Beechcraft 1900 and ATR 42 aircraft from Rossair Europe and subsequently Fokker 50s from Denim Air. EuroManx introduced its own aircraft leased from various operators during 2005 with two Avro RJ70, two Dornier 328s, a Bombardier Dash 8 Q200 and a Bombardier Dash 8 Q300 aircraft. In June 2005, EuroManx successfully bought the passenger service of Emerald Airways, another low-cost carrier operating services from Liverpool. These services were operated using an ATR leased from Aer Arann. Competition from Manx2 on the Belfast route increased with Manx2 launching a 10 daily service. In October 2005, prior to the arrival of Manx2, EuroManx restructured its operation, shutting down all its scheduled international services except Dublin, and eliminating domestic services to Bristol, Southampton, Glasgow and London Stansted airports. Its RJ70 fleet was announced as retired, however both airframes continued flying until withdrawal in February 2006. At that time, EuroManx restructured again and withdrew from the Dublin route. The Dornier 328 was also withdrawn and operations continued with the remaining two Dash 8 aircraft. Euromanx ceased all operations on 9 May 2008.

Destinations

EuroManx served the following destinations prior to cessation of services during May 2008:

Fleet

The EuroManx fleet consisted of the following aircraft prior to cessation of services:

References

Notes

Further reading

External links

Official site at the Wayback Machine
News site

Defunct airlines of the Isle of Man
Airlines established in 2002
Airlines disestablished in 2008
2002 establishments in the Isle of Man
2008 disestablishments in the Isle of Man
Defunct airlines of the United Kingdom